The 1992 USAC FF2000 Eastern Division Championship was the first season since the east/west split of the series by the United States Auto Club. Chris Simmons won the series championship for SOTARE Racing in a Van Diemen RF92.

Race calendar and results

Notes

Final standings

References

U.S. F2000 National Championship seasons
1992 in American motorsport